Gagen is an unincorporated community located in the town of Piehl, Oneida County, Wisconsin, United States.

History
The settlement started as a logging camp. The Gagen Tract, was one of the finest timber belts in the Northwoods and had stands of pine, birch, maple, spruce, and cedar. A post office called Gagen operated between 1895 and 1942. The community was named for Daniel Gagen, an early settler.

References

Unincorporated communities in Oneida County, Wisconsin
Unincorporated communities in Wisconsin